Acalolepta freudei is a species of beetle in the family Cerambycidae. It was described by Leopold Heyrovský in 1976.

References

Acalolepta
Beetles described in 1976